Kinokawa may refer to:
 Kinokawa, Wakayama, a city in Wakayama Prefecture, Japan
 Kinokawa River, a river in Nara and Wakayama Prefecture, Japan